The Silent World is a 1956 French documentary film co-directed by Jacques Cousteau and Louis Malle. One of the first films to use underwater cinematography to show the ocean depths in color, its title derives from Cousteau's 1953 book The Silent World: A Story of Undersea Discovery and Adventure.

Film 
The film was shot aboard the ship Calypso. Cousteau and his team of divers shot 25 kilometers of film over two years in the Mediterranean Sea, the Persian Gulf, the Red Sea and the Indian Ocean, of which 2.5 kilometers were included in the finished documentary.

The film later faced criticism for environmental damage done during the filmmaking. In one scene, the crew of the Calypso massacre a school of sharks that were drawn to the carcass of a baby whale for some reason, which itself had been mortally injured by the crew, albeit accidentally (Cousteau had the ship driven into a pod of whales to get a close-up view, striking one whale in the process before the baby was lacerated by the prop). In another, Cousteau uses dynamite near a coral reef in order to make a more complete census of the marine life in its vicinity. Cousteau later became more environmentally conscious, involved in marine conservation, and was even called "the father of the environmental movement" by Ted Turner.

Reception
The Silent World opened at the 1956 Cannes Film Festival and won the Palme d'Or award; it was the only documentary film to win the award until Michael Moore's Fahrenheit 9/11 repeated the feat in 2004.

The film was released in the United States on September 24, 1956 by Columbia Pictures and earned theatrical rentals of over $3 million.

It was the first of Cousteau's documentary films to win an Academy Award for Best Documentary Feature.

See also

References

External links
 
 
 
Jacques Cousteau's The Silent World by Greg Rubinson at salon.com, July 15, 2002, retrieved June 14, 2011

1956 films
Best Documentary Feature Academy Award winners
Palme d'Or winners
Documentary films about nature
Films directed by Jacques Cousteau
Films directed by Louis Malle
Documentary films about underwater diving
French documentary films
1956 documentary films
1950s French films